The Church of Saint Mary in Miadziel, Belarus, is a Catholic church, listed as a Cultural Heritage object. The church was constructed in 1754 for the Discalced Carmelites' monastery.

History

15th–19th centuries 
The document was signed by several high-ranked priests and noblemen.

The stone church for the Discalced Carmelites was built in 1754 by Miadziel's owner Antoniy Koshitz. An Octagon on cube type, it was topped with a faceted dome, frescoes covered the inner walls. The church was consecrated on August 15, 1754. By 1830, the local parish had more than 865 members. In the aftermath of the November Uprising all Carmelite monasteries within the borders of modern Belarus were closed. The monastery in Miadziel was disbanded in 1832, in 1863 all its buildings and the church of St Mary were given to the Orthodox church.

20th century 
In 1921 Miadziel became a part of the Second Polish Republic, in 1927 the monastery was returned to the Carmelites. They began the restoration that lasted up to 1941. During the Second World War, the monastery supported the Home Army. Its buildings were burned down in 1943 by the Soviet partisans, after the war the church was used as a warehouse for agricultural machinery.

In 1982 archaeologists Zianon Pazniak and  began excavations near the church and discovered a massive stone foundation and a fragment of a brick wall, that presumably was the Uniate church of the XVII century.

The church was consecrated again in 1990.

21st century 
In 2016 the church was restored. In January 2019 Belarusian media published the news about sensational discoveries in the church. In one of the walls the researchers found hallows of Pope Gregory I and Saint Cecilia.

Gallery

References

Sources 

Churches in Belarus
Landmarks in Belarus